Putatan is a barangay in Muntinlupa, Philippines. The total land area of the barangay is 6.746 km2. According to the 2020 census, it has a population of 99,725.

Putatan is located at the south of the City of Manila. It is bounded by barangays Alabang and Bayanan on the north, Laguna de Bay on the east, the Muntinlupa Poblacion on the south; and barangay Ayala Alabang on the west.

The barangay is also home to the city hall of Muntinlupa and its several departments.

History
Nakuha ng Putatan ang pangalan nito mula sa isang halaman, ang Putat isang species ng Barringtonia na katutubong sa mangrove habitats sa mga tropikal na baybayin at isla ng Indian Ocean at kanlurang Karagatang Pasipiko mula Zanzibar sa silangan hanggang Taiwan, Pilipinas, Fiji, New Caledonia, Solomon Islands, ang Cook Islands, Wallis at Futuna at French Polynesia.

Subdivisions
While barangays are the administrative divisions of the city, and are legally part of the addresses of establishments and homes, residents also include their subdivision. Listed below are subdivisions in this barangay.

Agro Homes Subdivision
Bayfair Subdivision
Bruger Subdivision
Camella Townhomes 1
Camella Townhomes 2
Camella Homes 1
Camella Homes 2
Camella Homes 2-D
Camella Homes 2-E
Country Homes
Express View Subdivision
Freedom Hills
Freewill Subdivision
God's Will Homes
Gruenville Subdivision
Jayson Ville
Joasmerray Subdivision
La Charina Homes
Lakeview Homes 1
Lakeview Homes 2
Multiland/Midland Subdivision
Mutual Homes Ph1 & 2
Mutual Homes Ph3
Neuwrain Subdivision
PUPA Homes
RCE Homes
Segundina Townhomes
SMB Hills
Soldiers Hills Subdivision
South Greenheights Subdivision
South Superville Subdivision
Summitville Subdivision
Treelane Subdivision
V.M. Townhomes
Hillsview Homes

References

External links
http://muntinlupacity.gov.ph/

Muntinlupa
Barangays of Metro Manila